The International Cat Association (TICA) is considered the world's largest genetic cat registry. Originally a North American organization, it now has a worldwide presence. The organization has a genetic registry for pedigreed and household pet cats and is one of the world's largest sanctioning bodies for cat shows.

Activities
TICA's activities include:

 encouraging its members to be owners, lovers and breeders of cats who work together to promote the preservation of pedigreed cats and the health and welfare of domestic cats
 maintaining a certified pedigree registry
 providing cat shows which promote both pedigreed and non-pedigreed cats
 promoting positive relations between breeders in the US and other countries
 setting up a foundation to encourage research on feline health issues and to provide lists of resource materials on health issues to its members

TICA catteries
Breeding catteries register their cattery name following the TICA naming standards. Certificates are awarded to Outstanding Catteries that meet strict health codes for the cats and their environment. As of this writing, 32 catteries meet these requirements. Riversiderags is the only Ragdoll cattery at present to receive this award from both TICA and CFA.

TICA cat shows
TICA administers the rules for the licensing and management of hundreds of cat shows annually in 104 countries. The TICA show season runs from May 1 to April 30 of a given year at which point all Regional and International Award points are reset. All TICA shows are open to the public.

A TICA cat show is a number of smaller shows all running at the same time in various “rings” throughout the show hall. Each ring is run by a licensed TICA judge who evaluates each cat based on a written standard that describes the ideal for each particular breed. Household pets and household pet kittens (cats of random or unknown breeding, or pedigree cats that for one reason or another cannot show in championship classes), are not judged against a standard but instead are evaluated on overall condition, health, appearance and personality.

Classes
TICA recognizes cats for competition in 8 classes. Each class is judged separately. For example, alters are not judged against kittens. Each cat entered in the show is assigned an identifying number based on its class and coat length so that exhibitors know when their cats are needed in a ring.

In the rare instance where there are more cats than fit in the range of numbers, the next class starts with the first available number. For example, if there are 55 longhair kittens, then those kittens are 1-55, the shorthair kittens would start at 56.

Rings

Judging ring
A typical judging ring is usually made up of an L or U shaped arrangement of cages, with the judge's table in the center. Three people normally work in each judging ring: the judge, clerk and steward.

All TICA judges are trained and licensed to thoroughly evaluate each breed of cat in order of how well they represent their individual breed standard.

The clerk acts as an executive assistant to the judge. They are responsible for the accuracy of all records of the ring. Each clerk keeps a marked catalog of the results of the ring and validates that what the judge writes in their own records is how the awards were presented in their evaluation to the audience.

A steward helps keeps the cages clean and disinfected in between cats in order to prevent illnesses from spreading.

Types of rings
There are two types of judging rings at TICA shows, Allbreed and Specialty. Allbreed rings will have all longhair cats and shorthair cats within each class judged together in competition with one another. In a Specialty ring, longhair cats within each class are only judged against longhair cats and shorthair cats are only judged against shorthair cats.

Regardless of the ring type, each judge evaluates every cat entered in the show.

Process

The cat show competition is structured like a pyramid. First, all of the entries are divided into their respective classes. Within each of these classes, cats are called to the judging ring according to breed, division and color/pattern.

The judge handles each cat placed in the judging ring. Each cat is taken from their cage, placed on the judging table and evaluated against the written standard for the breed. Some judges will use toys to get a better look at a cat's eye shape, ear size and placement and overall balance.

Although some associations make a cat's title known, the only information provided to a TICA judge about each cat is its: breed, color, sex and age. The judge has no way of knowing if it is the cat's first show or how it has performed in other rings.

Judging pyramid
After the judge is done evaluating each cat in a breed group, they will hang a colored ribbon on the cat's cages to award Best of Color and Division. TICA does not have Best of Breed ribbons but the judge will announce their choices and also note their selections in the Judge's Book. The clerk will also write down each of these selections for the record.

Best of Color: The judge will first award the best of color through the 5th Best of Color for each breed. For example, if seven blue British Shorthairs are competing; the judge will select and rank five of the seven.  The cat is judged against the whole breed standard, not just color. Out of the seven British Shorthairs competing they are judged against how the fulfill the full British Shorthair standard. “Best of Color” does not necessarily mean that the cat has the best blue coat.

All Household Pets and Household Pet Kittens will receive a Best of Color award regardless of how many cats of a particular color there are.

Best of Division: From the color winners, the judge will select a Best, Second and Third Best of Division. For example, the seven blue British Shorthairs belong to the Traditional Solid Division. Other solid colored British Shorthairs (white, lilac, cream) would also be judged in the Solid Division. Tabbies would be judged in the tabby division and so forth.

Household Pet Kittens do not receive division awards.

Best of Breed: Once a judge has selected their First through Third of Division cats, they will select Best, Second and Third Best of Breed from all of the breed's divisions.

Household Pet and Household Pet Kittens do not receive breed awards.

Finals
After the judge has seen all of the cats in a particular class, they decide on their best exhibits of each breed and then ask for them to be returned to the ring for a final. Finals are essentially a "Best in Show" for that particular ring.

Earlier placements are taken into consideration during finals as a cat that came in Second of Breed cannot place higher than a cat who was Best of Breed and so forth.

The judge will then explain their placings – between Top 5 and 10 depending on how many cats are competing. If there are 20 cats or less competing in one class the judge will award a Top 5, 21 cats are a Top 6, and so on, up to 25 cats or more which awards a Top 10. The only exception to this rule is the Household Pet and Household Pet Kitten class where a maximum of 10 places are awarded regardless of the number of cats in competition. So If only 8 Household Pet Kittens/Cats are competing the judge will award 8 placements.

Scoring

Points
All points earned are tracked by the TICA Executive Office in Harlingen, Texas. Points are awarded for placing in Color, Division and for each final awarded. Points are calculated ring-by-ring and tracked from the Judge's Book, a copy of which is sent to the Executive Office after a show.

Title points start accumulating with a cat's first adult show. Any balance of points from a previous title will be applied toward the next title. If a Championship Cat is altered it can keep the titles and points won as a whole cat or they can choose to start over.

Points are assigned best on color and division awarded in each ring. Points are not earned for breed placements.

Color and division

Finals
Points are also assigned based on the cat's placement in a final. The scores are different between Allbreed and Specialty rings.

For example, if a Chocolate Spotted Ocicat were to be awarded Best of Color and Best of Division, he would earn 50 points. First of color and second of division, would be 45 points and so on. If that same Ocicat were awarded Best Allbreed in a final, they would also earn 200 points on top of the 50 points for Color and Division.

Titles
Title points are computed by using the final award points plus Best of Color and Best of Division Points. Cats also need to earn a certain number of finals to achieve each title. With the exception of Championship Kittens and Household Pet Kittens, each class has its own set of titles although they are tiered equally and the requirements to reach them do not change. All cats begin their show career as a Novice (NOV), once a show is scored and titles are conferred by the Executive Office, the cat can add the title abbreviation to their registration.

Cats registered in isolated areas which do not see as many shows as other areas (as in Alaska) only require half the point values to achieve the titles and a lower number of finals.

Note: The Supreme title cannot be earned on the same day of the show as the Quadruple Title

Regional and International Awards

All TICA-registered kittens, cats, alters, HHPs and HHP Kittens can compete for Regional and International Awards during the show year. 
For adult cats, the Top 50 rings are used in computing season scores. For all kittens the top 30 rings are used. If a cat reaches the ring cap, the lowest score will be dropped in favor of a higher score. Points are computed by using the final award points PLUS cats defeated.

Color and Division points are not used for scoring Regional and International Points.

Regional and international points are computed by using the final award points plus cats defeated. For example, if there were 58 cats competing and your cat got 6th place in an Allbreed final the cat would earn 202 points, 150 (6th place) + 52 (as 5 cats placed higher and you placed higher than 52 of them) = 202 points towards Regional and International Awards. The same rules would apply in a specialty ring using the SP Ring finals chart.

Award ceremonies
The highest scoring cats, kittens, alters, household pet kittens and household pets are honored with Regional and International awards. Regional awards are presented at an award banquet hosted by each of the TICA regions. International Awards are presented at the Annual Convention and Awards Banquet on Labor Day weekend.

Each region takes turns hosting the Annual Convention. The Annual has previously been hosted in Bellevue, Washington, Worcester, Massachusetts, Columbus, Ohio, and Salzburg, Austria. Also presented at the banquet are the Best of Breed Cats for the show season.

Recognized breeds
As the world's largest genetic registry of pedigreed cats, TICA currently recognizes seventy-one breeds of cats for championship competition. In addition, the number of breeds can change as new breeds are developed.

Listed in alphabetical order by breed,

Championship breeds
Breeds of cats that have been accepted for championship and are recognized as being eligible to compete in TICA sanctioned shows and eligible for appropriate titles and/or computation of Annual Awards. These cats must be eight months of age or more and may be male, female, neuter or spay. Pedigreed kittens (under eight months of age) do not earn titles, but are eligible to compete in TICA sanctioned shows and may earn points towards Annual Awards.

 A - Abyssinian, American Bobtail, American Bobtail Longhair, American Curl, American Curl Longhair, American Shorthair, American Wirehair, Australian Mist
 B - Balinese, Bengal, Birman, Bombay, British Longhair, British Shorthair, Burmese, Burmilla,  Burmilla Longhair
 C - Chartreux, Chausie, Cornish Rex, Cymric
 D - Devon Rex, Donskoy
 E - Egyptian Mau, Exotic Shorthair
 H - Havana Brown, Himalayan
 J - Japanese Bobtail, Japanese Bobtail Longhair
 K - Khao Manee, Korat, Kurilian Bobtail, Kurilian Bobtail Longhair
 L - LaPerm, LaPerm Longhair, Lykoi
 M - Maine Coon, Maine Coon Polydactyl, Manx, Minuet, Minuet, Munchkin, Munchkin
 N - Nebelung, Norwegian Forest Cat
 O - Ocicat, Oriental Longhair, Oriental Shorthair
 P - Persian, Peterbald, Pixiebob, Pixiebob Longhair
 R - Ragdoll, Russian Blue
 S - Savannah, Scottish Fold, Scottish Fold Longhair, Scottish Straight, Scottish Straight Longhair, Selkirk Rex, Selkirk Rex Longhair, Siamese, Siberian, Singapura, Snowshoe, Somali, Sphynx
 T - Thai, Tonkinese, Toyger, Turkish Angora, Turkish Van

Advanced new breeds
The second level of the Championship Advancement Class Program. These breeds are eligible to be shown in TICA sanctioned shows but do not earn titles or points towards Annual Awards and must follow specific rules to be eligible for championship status.

 H - Highlander, Highlander Shorthair
 S - Serengeti

Preliminary new breeds
The beginning level of the Championship Advancement Class Program. These breeds are eligible to be shown in TICA sanctioned shows but do not earn titles or points towards Annual Awards and must follow specific rules to be eligible for the next step in achieving championship status.

 A - Aphrodite Longhair, Aphrodite
 M - Minskin
 T - Tennessee Rex, Tennessee Rex Shorthair, Toybob Longhair, Toybob

Registration only
TICA accepts cats for registration only. Under this status the association agrees to provide registration facilities for development of the breed in question. There is no guarantee that TICA will accept the breed for advancement.

 O - Ojos Azules
 S - Sokoke

Non-championship breeds
This class consists of Household Pets and Household Pet Kittens. Household pets earn titles comparable to Championship cats and are eligible to compete in TICA sanctioned shows and may earn points towards Annual Awards. Household pet kittens do not earn titles, but are eligible to compete in TICA sanctioned shows and may earn points towards Annual Awards.

Experimental breeds
The Experimental Record is for tracking the parentage of cats not yet recognized in TICA for the Stud Book or Foundation Registries. Tracking of these proposed breeds will provide a precise chronicle of the proposed breed's progress and development. Records will include analysis of any genetic problems inherent in a particular breeding program thus proving or disproving its future acceptance as a viable, healthy breed.

Regions
TICA is divided into of 14 regions.  Regions are grouped together geographically.

Americas
 Great Lakes - Illinois, Indiana, Iowa, Kentucky, Manitoba, Canada, Michigan, Minnesota, Missouri, Nebraska, North Dakota, Nunavut Canada, Ohio, Saskatchewan Canada, South Dakota, Wisconsin
 Mid Atlantic - Delaware, District Of Columbia, Maryland, New Jersey, Pennsylvania, Virginia, West Virginia
 Mid Pacific - Northern California, Nevada, Utah
 Northeast - APO, Connecticut, Maine, Massachusetts, New Brunswick Canada, New Hampshire, New York, Newfoundland Canada, Nova Scotia Canada, Ontario Canada, Prince Edward Island Canada, Quebec, Rhode Island, Vermont
 Northwest - Alaska, Alberta Canada, British Columbia Canada, Idaho, Montana, N W Territory Canada, Oregon, Washington, Wyoming, Yukon
 South America - Argentina, Bolivia, Brazil, Chile, Colombia, Costa Rica, Ecuador, El Salvador, Panama, Paraguay, Peru, Uruguay, Venezuela
 South Central - Arkansas, Colorado, Kansas, Louisiana, Mexico, Oklahoma, Texas
 Southeast - Alabama, Bermuda, Florida, Georgia, Guadeloupe, Martinique, Mississippi, North Carolina, Puerto Rico, South Carolina, Tennessee, Us Virgin Islands
 Southwest - Arizona, Hawaii, Southern California, New Mexico

Asia
Japan, North Korea, South Korea

Europe
 Northern Europe - Belgium, Belarus, Denmark, Estonia, Finland, Germany, Latvia, Liechtenstein, Lithuania, Luxembourg, Norway, Poland, Russia, Sweden, The Netherlands, Ukraine
 Southern Europe - Albania, Austria, Bosnia-Herzogovina, Bulgaria, Croatia, Cyprus, Czech Republic, France, Gibraltar, Greece, Hungary, Israel, Italy, Kuwait, Macedonia, Malta, Moldova, Monaco, Montenegro, Portugal, Qatar, Romania, Saudi Arabia, Serbia, Slovakia, Slovenia, Spain, Switzerland, Turkey, UAE
 Western Europe - Channel Islands, England, Iceland, Ireland, Isle Of Mann, Northern Ireland, Scotland, Wales

International
Australia, Brunei Darussalam, China, Hong Kong, Indonesia, Malaysia, New Caledonia, New Zealand, Pakistan, Philippines, Singapore, South Africa, Taiwan, Thailand.

TICA Trend
The International Cat Association publishes the TICA Trend, an official bi-monthly magazine that is distributed to the association's members as part of their membership. The Trend contains current TICA news, a calendar of upcoming shows, and articles on cat health and care, breeding and showing. The magazine also spotlights cats that have earned titles at shows.

The Trend also contains board of director meeting minutes, financial reports for each region, and a list of all licensed and trainee clerks and judges.

Judith Milling is the current editor of the Trend.

References

External links
The International Cat Association (TICA)
TICA in the UK website (includes information on TICA relations with the British GCCA)
TICA in Germany 
CatTICA All-breeds Cat Club (The first independent UK aff 

Cat registries
Organizations established in 1979 iliate)

Clubs and societies in the United States
Cat fancy